Sufi or Soofi or Sowfi in Iran may refer to:
 Sufi, Kurdistan, a village in Kurdistan Province, Iran
 Sufi, West Azerbaijan, a village in West Azerbaijan Province, Iran